Ernesto Bergamasco

Biography

Amateur career 
He was the Italian amateur champion in super light weight in 1971 in Udine and in 1972 in Rome.

He has defended the Italian colors in many international competitions.  He participated in the  1972 Olympics in Munich, losing in the first round of the super light category to Thai Srisook Buntoe (4ː1).

Professional career 
He turned pro right after the Olympics.  He had a winning streak of 19 matches all won.  Among his defeated opponents, the former Italian champion of lightweights Bruno Melissano.

On 25 September 1974 he fought for the Italian Super Lightweight title but was defeated by technical knock-out in the second round by keeper Bruno Freschi.  He went on to fight, racking up another six consecutive victories and then proceeding in the downward parable of his career.  Between the end of 1975 and 1977 he fought 14 matches with only six wins and eight defeats.  One of these, however, was suffered by the Argentine naturalized Italian Juan José Giménez, future challenger of the American Leroy Haley for the world title  WBC of the category and of Patrizio Oliva for the European title.

On February 3, 1978 he was given the chance to fight again for the Italian super light belt but was again defeated by the future European champion Giuseppe Martinese for KOT in the eighth round.  After this match he abandoned his competitive career.

Coaching career 
Founder and manager of one of the most famous boxing clubs in the Vesuvius area, the  Oplonti Boxing , as a coach he brought many high-value boxers to the  ring, including his son Raffaele Bergamasco, multiple Italian champion, and among the professionals Alfonso Pinto (silver medal at the European Championships) and Pietro Aurino, engaged in London in 2002 as a challenger to the conquest - failed - the world light heavyweight title.

References

External links
 

1950 births
Living people
Italian male boxers
Olympic boxers of Italy
Boxers at the 1972 Summer Olympics
Boxers from Naples
Light-welterweight boxers